The quarter, short for quarter dollar, is a Canadian coin worth 25 cents or one-fourth of a Canadian dollar. It is a small, circular coin of silver colour. According to the Royal Canadian Mint, the official name for the coin is the 25-cent piece, but in practice it is usually called a "quarter", much like its American counterpart. In French, it is called a caribou or trente sous ("thirty sous", based on the old exchange rate). The coin is produced at the Royal Canadian Mint's facility in Winnipeg, Manitoba.

History of composition

From 1920 until 1967 the quarter contained 0.15 troy ounces of silver—one quarter as much as the silver dollar (0.60 ozt), one half as much as the 50-cent piece, and  times more than the dime.

Commemorative reverses

Ordinarily featuring a caribou, the quarter has the most commonly altered reverse in Canada and is the usual venue for commemorative issues.

In 2004, a quarter was issued in honour of Remembrance Day, featuring a corn poppy on the reverse, a traditional symbol in Canada of that day. This resulted in a bizarre international incident, in which American military contractors unfamiliar with the coin's design believed these coins were outfitted with nanotechnology designed for espionage.

Single commemorative designs

1992: 125th anniversary of Confederation

In 1992, to celebrate the 125th anniversary of Confederation, the Mint released twelve commemorative coins, one for each Canadian province and territory at the time. These were the inspiration for the US 50 State Quarters program of 1999–2008. Nunavut, which separated from the Northwest Territories seven years later in 1999, was honoured with a special $2 coin.

1999–2000: millennium quarters

In April 1998, the Mint announced the "Millennium Coin Design Contest", a contest open to all Canadians to submit designs for twenty-four millennium quarters, one for each month of 1999 and 2000. The 1999 designs were meant to look back on Canada's past, while the 2000 designs looked to the future. While the 1999 coins were labeled with their month of issue, the 2000 coins were labeled with the relevant theme.

2005: Alberta and Saskatchewan centennials
In 2005, to celebrate the centennials of the provinces of Alberta and Saskatchewan, two commemorative quarters were issued. The public was given the opportunity to vote on the coin design through two toll-free phone numbers.

There were four candidate designs for the Alberta quarter: Big Sky Country, Alberta's Natural Beauty, A Dynamic Century, and Rocky Mountain Bighorn Sheep. The winning design was Big Sky Country, by Michelle Grant, and depicted an oil derrick with cattle grazing at its base. The coin had a mintage of 20,640,000.

There were three candidate designs for the Saskatchewan quarter: The Western Meadowlark, Canada Geese over Wascana Lake, and The Round Dance Celebration. The winning design was Western Meadowlark, designed by Paulette Sapergia. The coin's mintage was 19,290,000.

2007–2010: Vancouver Olympics 2010

2011: Legendary Nature

2012: War of 1812 bicentennial

First strikes

Olympic first strikes

Canada Day

Since 2000, the RCM has been issuing colourized quarters on Canada Day with designs aimed to attract young collectors. As with other collector coins issued by the RCM, the Canada Day series coins are non-circulating legal tender.

Other notable dates

 The 1906 Small Crown is valued in the thousands of dollars even for very poor conditions.
 1936 marked two valuable variations, the Bar and the Dot, both trend for over $1,000 in uncirculated condition.
 The 1951 Low Relief was predominantly only made available in proof-like sets and have a mintage of around 500.
 The 1973 Large Bust is among the most desired Canadian Quarter. They sell for around $300 in Proof Like or Specimen condition and can sell in the thousands for high-end circulation strikes.
 The 1991 quarter had a low mintage, of 459,000
 The 1992 New Brunswick quarter has several rotated die versions, with the 180-degree rotation selling for between $100 and $200 in uncirculated condition.
 1999 featured mule versions of the September and November quarters. These coins do not have the 25 CENTS mark on them, making them legal tender without face value. Either usually sells for over $10 depending on the condition of the coin. The Royal Canadian Mint estimates a combined mintage of 10,000 to 50,000 of the September and November mules.
 The 2000 Millennium Map mule. Highly sought after by collectors, this is a modern rarity with about 100 known examples, as referenced in population reports of coin certification services (ICCS, CCCS, PCGS, NGC).
 2000P Caribou: two examples are known to exist. They fetch $40,000 or more (ICCS has graded both in MS-64: ICCS 2010 Population report). Both are in private collections.
 2000P Creativity: two are known to exist. They fetch $15,000 to $20,000 (ICCS has graded one in MS-62 and the other in MS-66: ICCS 2010 Population report).
 2000P Community: five are known to exist. They fetch $12,000 to $15,000 (ICCS has graded one in MS-60, two in MS-62, and two in MS-63: ICCS 2010 Population report).

The Tooth Fairy and Friends
Starting in 2011, the mint began selling special sets for newborn babies, birthdays, wedding anniversaries, "Oh Canada" and the Tooth Fairy. The tooth fairy quarters also come packaged separately.

Facts

 The first commemorative coins were planned for 1927 to celebrate Canada's 60th anniversary. A contest was held and the winner for the twenty-five-cent coin was J.A.H. MacDonald; however, the Mint decided to not turn the design into coinage.
When coinage was changed in 1937, the caribou (currently on the quarter) was originally planned for the five-cent coin, the beaver (nickel) was planned for the ten-cent coin, and the Bluenose (dime) was planned for the twenty-five-cent coin.
The lowest mintage of any circulated quarter post-World War II was in 1991; low mintage was attributed to a work stoppage and using up stock in preparation for the release of the commemorative quarters the following year. The total mintage was a mere 459,000 including collector sets and proofs.
Canadian quarters were not issued into circulation in 1997 and 1998. In 1997, only 525,257 quarters were produced. In 1998, only 395,617 quarters were produced; even fewer than in 1991. All of them were issued in collector sets or proofs and none were issued into circulation.
The caribou on the 25-cent piece dates back to 1936 when a change in the sovereign's image on circulation currency prompted the Canadian government to modify the designs on the reverse side of coins as well. The caribou design was created by Canadian artist Emanuel Hahn, initially used in 1937. It has been temporarily replaced in some years; in 1967 for the Canadian centennial (with a Canada lynx), in 1973 to celebrate the centennial of the North-West Mounted Police, in 1992 for Canada's 125th anniversary, and in 1999 and 2000 by the winning designs of the Millennium coin program.

References

External links

Royal Canadian Mint Act (archived 26 January 2016)
 Coins and Canada Price Guide
 Royal Canadian Numismatic Association
 Royal Canadian Mint Remembrance Day Poppy Coin

1870 establishments in Canada
Coins of Canada
Twenty-five-cent coins
Deer in art